Timberlake High School is a four-year public secondary school  in Spirit Lake, Idaho. Opened in 1998 at the south end of town, it is the second high school in the Lakeland Joint School District #272 of northern Kootenai County and draws its students from Spirit Lake, Athol, Bayview, and Twin Lakes.  The school colors are navy blue, gold, and white, and its mascot is the white tiger.

Timberlake originally was six grades and included grades 7 and 8; a separate junior high was built on the north end of the campus and opened in 2004.

History
The Lakeland Joint School District was formed in 1948 by consolidating 13 smaller districts; In 1962, the high schools in Spirit Lake and Rathdrum were consolidated into the new Lakeland High School in Rathdrum. A new Lakeland campus was constructed in 1979 and high enrollment in the district in the 1990s led to the construction of Timberlake.

Athletics
Timberlake competes in athletics in IHSAA Class 3A and is a member of the Intermountain League with Bonners Ferry, Priest River, and Kellogg.

State titles

Boys
 Basketball (1): (B) 1942  (as Spirit Lake H.S.) 
 Track (3): (3A) 2004, 2006, 2007

Girls
 Cross Country (3): fall (3A) 2009, 2010, 2011  
 Track (1): (3A) 2011 
 Basketball (1): (3A) 2016

Individual
 Men’s Wrestling (285 lbs.): David Howard
 Men’s Wrestling (140 lbs.) David Hayes
 Men's Wrestling (285 lbs.): Dylan White
 Men's Wrestling (126 lbs.): Caleb Miller
 Men's Wrestling (182 lbs.): Joey Follini

References

External links
 
 Lakeland Joint School District #272

Public high schools in Idaho
Schools in Kootenai County, Idaho
Educational institutions established in 1998
1998 establishments in Idaho